São Sebastião is an interchange station where the Blue and Red Lines of the Lisbon Metro connect, being located on Avenida António Augusto de Aguiar in the São Sebastião da Pedreira neighbourhood.

History
The Blue Line station is one of the 11 stations that belong to the original Lisbon Metro network, opened on 29 December 1959. 

The architectural design of the original Blue Line station is by Francisco Keil do Amaral. On 18 April 1997 the Blue Line station was extended, based on the architectural design of Dinis Gomes. 

On 29 August 2009 the Red Line station was built, based on the architectural design of Tiago Henriques, and the Blue Line station was refurbished, also based on the architectural design of Tiago Henriques.

Connections

Urban buses

Carris 
 713 Alameda D. A. Henriques ⇄ Estação Campolide 
 742 Bairro Madre Deus (Escola) ⇄ Casalinho da Ajuda
 746 Marquês de Pombal ⇄ Estação Damaia

See also
 List of Lisbon metro stations

References

External links

Red Line (Lisbon Metro) stations
Blue Line (Lisbon Metro) stations
Railway stations opened in 1959
1959 establishments in Portugal
São Sebastião da Pedreira